Richard Halford (1662–1742), of Edith Weston, Rutland, England, was an English Tory politician who sat in the English and British House of Commons between 1698 and 1713.

Halford was the eldest son of Charles Halford of Edith Weston, and his wife Elizabeth Mitchell, daughter of Thomas Michell of South Witham, Lincolnshire. He was admitted at Lincoln's Inn in 1679. In 1696, he succeeded his father.

Halford was returned as  Member of Parliament (MP)  for Rutland at the 1698 English general election. He was returned aagain at the two general elections of 1701 and in 1702, 1705 and 1708. At the 1710 British general election, he was defeated in the poll but was seated on petition on 23 January 1711. He was not returned at the 1713 British general election.

Halford died unmarried on 28 September 1742, aged 80.

References

1662 births
1742 deaths
People from Rutland
Members of the Parliament of Great Britain for English constituencies
English MPs 1698–1700
English MPs 1701
English MPs 1701–1702
English MPs 1702–1705
English MPs 1705–1707
British MPs 1707–1708
British MPs 1708–1710
British MPs 1710–1713